Iphigenia Efunjoke Coker (1924-2019) was a Nigerian educator. From 1963 to 1977 she was Principal of Queen's College, Lagos, the first person of Nigerian descent to hold the position.

Life
Iphigenia Efunjoke Coker was born in Lagos on 29 September 1924, the daughter of Mr. and Mrs. Bankole Soluade. She attended St. Mary’s Convent School, St. Theresa’s High School, St. Agnes’s Teacher Training College and Queen's College, Lagos. In the 1940s she taught at St. Teresa’s High School in Lagos and Ibadan and at St. Agnes’s in Lagos.

From 1952 to 1956 she studied at University College Dublin. Returning to Nigeria, she taught at Queen’s School, Ede and Government College, Ibadan. In 1962 she became Vice Principal at Queen’s College, and was appointed Principal the following year. She remained there until retirement in 1977.

In 1979 General Olusegun Obasanjo made Coker a Member of the Order of the Federal Republic (MFR). In 2017 she was awarded an honorary doctorate from the Federal University Oye-Ekiti.
 
She died on 23 December 2019.

References

External links
 Efunjo Coker tributes

1924 births
2019 deaths
Heads of schools in Nigeria
Alumni of University College Dublin
Members of the Order of the Federal Republic
Queen's College, Lagos alumni
Nigerian women educators
Women school principals and headteachers
Nigerian expatriates in Ireland